Elizabeth Strohfus (November 15, 1919 – March 6, 2016) was an American aviator and pioneering member of the Women Airforce Service Pilots (WASP) during World War II. Strohfus, one of just 1,074 female pilots to earn silver wings for the WASPs, flew noncombat missions from 1943 to 1944, often ferrying military planes throughout the United States. She also trained male air and infantry gunners at Las Vegas Army Airfield during the early 1940s. Elizabeth Strohfus was the recipient of two Congressional Gold Medals for her service in the WASPs and was inducted into the Minnesota Aviation Hall of Fame. She was believed to be one of the last surviving WASP aviators.

Strohfus, who was the fifth of her parents' six children, was born on November 19, 1919, in Faribault, Minnesota. Following high school, Strohfus borrowed $100 from a local bank, utilizing her bicycle as collateral, and joined the Sky Club, an all-male aviators club. She worked as a Sky Club volunteer in exchange for a chance to fly. Her first flight was in a Piper Cub.

The WASPs were disbanded in December 1944. Her application to become a pilot at Northwest Airlines was rejected. Instead, she became an aircraft controller in Wyoming. She then moved back to Faribault, where she married and had children.

Strohfus began speaking about her experience as a member of WASP and a female aviator beginning in the 1980s. In 1991, she became one of the first women to pilot an F-16 when she was 71-years old. Strohfus later flew as a passenger for a 4.5 Gs acrobatic plane ride when she was 95 years old.

Strohfus died from complications from a fall at the Milestone Senior Living Center in Faribault, Minnesota, on March 6, 2016, at the age of 96.

References

1919 births
2016 deaths
Women Airforce Service Pilots personnel
Aviators from Minnesota
People from Faribault, Minnesota
21st-century American women
Military personnel from Minnesota